The 2020 Vietnamese National Cup (known as the Bamboo Airways National Cup for sponsorship reasons) season is the 28th edition of the Vietnamese Cup, the football knockout competition of Vietnam organized by the Vietnam Football Federation.

First round

Round of 16

Quarter–final round

Semi-finals

Final

Brackets

Top scorers

References

Vietnamese National Cup
Vietnam
Cup